The 2016 ADAC TCR Germany Touring Car Championship was the first season of touring car racing to be run by the German-based sanctioning body ADAC to newly created TCR regulations. The series ran predominantly in ADAC's home nation Germany. As a support category to the ADAC GT Masters series, the championship also took in races in the neighbouring nations of Austria and the Netherlands.

Teams and drivers
Hankook is the official tyre supplier.

Calendar and results
The 2016 schedule was announced on 13 November 2015, with two events scheduled to be held outside Germany. The second Oschersleben round supported the International Series along with ADAC Formula 4, while the rest of the rounds were part of the ADAC GT Masters weekends.

Championship standings

Drivers' Championship

† – Drivers did not finish the race, but were classified as they completed over 75% of the race distance.
‡ – Half points were awarded in Race 1 at Circuit Park Zandvoort as less than 75% of the scheduled distance was completed due to Bas Schouten deliberately blocking the Pit Lane exit after a start crash to force the Red Flag. After the Red Flag was shown, the restart would come only moments later, but there was not enough time to complete enough laps.

Junior class

Teams' Championship

Notes

References

External links
 

2016 in German motorsport
Germany Touring Car Championship